The Tailem Bend–Keith pipeline provides treated water drawn from the Murray River to communities in the Upper South East region of South Australia. It extends  from Tailem Bend southeast to Keith. It runs roughly parallel to both the Dukes Highway and the Adelaide–Wolseley railway line.

The pipeline was constructed by the South Australian government with financial assistance from the Australian government provided under the South Australia Grant (Tailem Bend to Keith Pipeline) Act 1969.

The storage facility at Coomandook was expanded in 2019 with the addition of a new  tank.

References

Pipelines in South Australia